is a Japanese professional darts player who plays in World Darts Federation (WDF) and other national events. She is a five-time Japan Open champion and she representing her country eight-time at the World Masters, where she four-time advanced to the quarter-finals. One of the most successful darts players from Japan and first WDF World Cup women medalist from this country.

Career
Her first international success was winning a silver medal at the 2004 WDF Asia-Pacific Cup in women's pairs competition, with the best Japanese women darts player at this time Yukari Nishikawa. In the final match they lost 0–4 in legs to Megan Smith and Jannette Jonathan from New Zealand and take the silver medal. Her first single achievement came a year later during the 2005 WDF World Cup, where she advanced to semi-finals and lost 0–4 in legs to Clare Bywaters, ending the game with a bronze medal.

In 2012, Ōuchi was invited to participate in the Professional Darts Corporation (PDC) tournament 2012 DPA Tournament of Champions held in Australia. In the first round match, she was defeated by Graham Filby from South Africa.

Personal life
Her father, Masatami Ōuchi was also a darts player, with some success at the national level in 2003–2007. Besides darts, Mayumi is also a surfing amateur.

World Championship results

WDF
 2023:

Performance timeline

References

Living people
1979 births
Japanese darts players
Female darts players
People from Yokosuka, Kanagawa